Scarlat is a Romanian male given name and surname that may refer to:

Scarlat Callimachi
Scarlat Callimachi (hospodar)
Scarlat Cantacuzino
Scarlat Ghica
Cristina Scarlat
Roxana Scarlat

Romanian masculine given names
Romanian-language surnames